Lorenzo Palomo (Ciudad Real, 1938) is a Spanish composer and conductor. He was chief conductor of the Valencia Symphony Orchestra, Spain, from 1973 to 1976 and conductor and pianist of the Deutsche Oper Berlin from 1981 to 2004. Lorenzo Palomo resides in Berlin, Germany.

Biography 
Soon after his birth in Ciudad Real in 1938, where his father was stationed during the Spanish Civil War, his mother returned with him to Pozoblanco, Spain where the family lived, and shortly afterwards they moved to Córdoba where the composer spent his youth.

Palomo studied piano and harmony at the Córdoba Conservatory and at the age of twenty he entered the Barcelona Superior Conservatory of Music, where he studied composition with Joaquín Zamacois and piano with Sofía Puche de Mendlewicz.

Works

Compositions 
 La leyenda del Monte Bangkay - Ballet
 Del atardecer al alba - Song Cycle for voice and piano / voice and orchestra
 Tientos - Song for voice and piano / voice and orchestra
 Plenilunio - Song for voice and piano / voice and orchestra
 Una primavera andaluza - Song Cycle for voice and piano / voice and orchestra
 Nocturnos de Andalucía - Suite concertante for guitar and orchestra
 FdB - Música para un festival - For orchestra
 Andalusian Divertimento - Piano Trio
 Concierto de Cienfuegos - For four guitars and orchestra
 Cantos del alma - Suite-fantasy for soprano, clarinet and orchestra
 Madrigal y Cinco canciones sefardíes - Song Cycle for voice and guitar / voice and piano / voice and harpe
 Dulcinea - Cantata-Fantasy for soprano, alto, tenor, bass, chorus and orchestra
 Danza-Scherzo - For oboe and piano
 Sinfonía a Granada - For soprano, guitar and orchestra
 Fanfarria para una noche de estío - For trombone quartet
 Toccata - For guitar
 Nocturno y Danza - For orchestra
 Rebeka’s Rainbow - Song for voice and piano
 Mi jardín solitario - Song Cycle for voice and guitar / voice and piano
 Perlas y lágrimas - For guitar
 Helianthus - For guitar
 El amor de los dos ositos - Symphonic Fairy Tale for soprano, mezzo and orchestra
 Pinceladas de primavera - Suite for two guitars
Fulgores - For violin, guitar and orchestra
The Sneetches (Dr. Seuss’ The Sneetches) - Symphonic poem for narrator and orchestra / narrator and two pianos
Caribiana - For orchestra
Sinfonía Córdoba - For orchestra, including a short intervention of voice and guitar
Humoresca - For double bass and orchestra
Arabescos - For violin and orchestra
Fantasía sobre temas del folklore alemán - For violin and guitar
Escenas de una primavera alemana - Song cycle for voice and guitar
Aldonza y Alonso - For soprano, tenor, chorus and piano
El jardín de Baco - For violin and orchestra
Rumbalina - For clarinet and piano
Sendero mágico - Song cycle for voice and piano

Instrumental, choral and orchestral transcriptions 
 La Revoltosa, prelude (R. Chapí) - Transcription for four guitars
 La Verbena de la Paloma, prelude (T. Bretón) - Transcription for four guitars
 Bohemios, intermezzo (A. Vives) - Transcription for four guitars
 Maruxa, intermezzo (A. Vives) - Transcription for four guitars
 El anillo de hierro, intermezzo (P. M. Marqués) - Transcription for four guitars
 Three Sonatas of Padre Antonio Soler - Transcription for two guitars
 Latino - Chorus and orchestrations of melodies from Spain and South America
 Canciones del mundo - Chorus and orchestrations of melodies of the world

Recordings 
Andalusian Nocturnes (Nocturnos de Andalucía) - for guitar and orchestra
Spanish Songs (Canciones Españolas) - for voice and orchestra
Cantos del alma (Songs of the Soul) - for soprano, clarinet and orchestra
Sinfonía a Granada (Granada Symphony) - for soprano, guitar and orchestra
Dulcinea - for soprano, tenor, baritone, bass, chorus and orchestra
My Secluded Garden - for voice and guitar
Madrigal y Cinco canciones sefardíes - for voice and guitar
Concierto de Cienfuegos - for guitar quartet and orchestra
Sinfonía Córdoba - for guitar and orchestra, including a short intervention of voice and guitar
Fulgores - for violin, guitar and orchestra
Arabescos - for violin and orchestra
Caribiana - for orchestra
Humoresca - for double bass and orchestra
Dr. Seuss’ The Sneetches - for narrator and orchestra

Honours 
In 2010 Lorenzo Palomo was knighted into the Order of Isabel la Católica by His Majesty, King Juan Carlos I of Spain for his work disseminating the name of Spain worldwide through his music.

References



1938 births
Spanish composers
Spanish male composers
Living people